Ivor Foulkes (born 22 February 1955) is a South African cricketer. He played in 81 first-class and 21 List A matches from 1973/74 to 1987/88.

References

External links
 

1955 births
Living people
South African cricketers
Border cricketers
Eastern Province cricketers
Free State cricketers
People from Luanshya